Himantolophus cornifer is a species of footballfish, a type of anglerfish. It has been found in the Indian, Pacific, and Atlantic Oceans.

References

Himantolophidae
Deep sea fish
Fish described in 1961
Taxa named by Erik Bertelsen